This is a list of cricketers who have played first-class, List A or Twenty20 cricket for the Otago cricket team. Otago played its first representative match in January 1864 against Southland, before playing the first match in New Zealand which is considered to be first-class later in the same month, a fixture against Canterbury. The team has competed for the Plunket Shield since its inaugural season in 1906/07, played its first List A cricket match in 1971 and its first Twenty20 cricket match in 2006. It has played in every senior cricket competition in New Zealand. The modern Otago Cricket Association represents the regions of Otago, Southland and North Otago of New Zealand's South Island and is one of six first-class teams in the country.

Players are listed in alphabetical order. Seasons given are the first and last seasons the player played at senior level for the side. Players may not have played in every intervening season and many players will have appeared for other sides during their career.

A

Bruce Abernethy, 1981/82–1982/83
Alfred Ackroyd, 1906/07
Alan Adams, 1905/06–1907/08
Thomas Adams, 1907/08
Greg Aim, 1955/56
Gren Alabaster, 1955/56–1975/76
Jack Alabaster, 1956/57–1971/72
Barry Allan, 1956/57
James Allan, 1993/94–1997/98
Cyril Allcott, 1945/46
John Allen, 1869/70–1874/75
John Henry Allen, 1944/45
Albert Alloo, 1914/15
Arthur Alloo, 1913/14–1930/31
Cecil Alloo, 1919/20–1928/29
Geoff Anderson, 1961/62–1964/65
Hayden Anderson, 1999/2000
Lon Anderson, 1973/74
Leslie Anderson, 1923/24
Robert Anderson, 1971/72–1976/77
Thomas Andrew, 1872/73
Bryan Andrews, 1970/71–1973/74
John Aris, 1870/71
Michael Austen, 1989/90–1997/98
Gerald Austin, 1896/97–1912/13
Tal Austin, 1877/78–1888/89
Ma'ara Ave, 2021/22
Francis Ayles, 1908/09

B

Matthew Bacon, 2016/17–2022/23
Ted Badcock, 1930/31–1936/37
Roald Badenhorst, 2014/15–2015/16
Geoffrey Baker, 1993/94
Henry Baker, 1925/26
James Clark Baker, 1889/90–1906/07
Lewis Baker, 1944/45–1945/46
Wilfred Bannerman, 1911/12–1914/15
Warren Barnes, 2015/16–2018/19
James Barron, 1917/18–1929/30
Peter Barton, 1964/65
Carl Beal, 1906/07–1908/09
William Beal, 1909/10
Nick Beard, 2008/09–2015/16
Simon Beare, 2001/02–2004/05
Tom Beaton, 2016/17
Clem Beck, 1884/85–1890/91
Victor Beeby, 1919/20
Gary Beer, 1965/66–1967/68
Neil Begg, 1939/40–1940/41
Arthur Bell, 1888/89–1893/94
Reginald Bell, 1914/15–1920/21
Francis Bellamy, 1944/45–1945/46
Arthur Berry, 1955/56
Ian Billcliff, 1990/91–1994/95
Mark Billcliff, 1998/99–2000/01
James Black, 1895/96
Bruce Blair, 1976/77–1989/90
James Blair, 1926/27
Roy Blair, 1953/54
Wayne Blair, 1967/68–1990/91
Geoff Blakely, 1980/81–1984/85
Jim Blakely, 1940/41–1950/51
John Blakely, 1940/41–1946/47
Sam Blakely, 2012/13–2014/15
Ernest Blamires, 1923/24–1926/27
Allan Bligh, 1989/90
Roger Blunt, 1926/27–1931/32
Henry Boddington, 1883/84–1895/96
Stephen Boock, 1973/74–1989/90
Joseph Borton, 1864/65–1865/66
Graham Botting, 1953/54
George Bottomley, 1889/90
A Bouch, 1876/77 
Brendon Bracewell, 1981/82–1982/83
John Bracewell, 1978/79–1981/82
Mark Bracewell, 1977/78
Michael Bracewell, 2010/11–2016/17
Dennis Brady, 1971/72
Lindsay Breen, 1991/92–1997/98
Kevin Briggs, 1959/60
William Brinsley, 1917/18
Charles Broad, 1897/98–1899/1900
Darren Broom, 2009/10–2012/13
Neil Broom, 2005/06–2021/22
Robert Brown, 1870/71
John Bruges, 1913/14–1914/15
Thomas Bryden, 1912/13–1913/14
Anthony Bullick, 2007/08–2010/11
Kevin Burns, 1980/81–1991/92
John Burt, 1901/02–1908/09
Ian Butler, 2008/09–2013/14
William Butler, 1901/02
George Butlin, 1889/90
Thomas Butterworth, 1866/67

C

Alexander Cairns, 1867/68–1870/71
Henry Cairns, 1864/65–1869/70
Lance Cairns, 1976/77–1979/80
Donald Cameron, 1930/31
Ewen Cameron, 1953/54–1954/55
Frank Cameron, 1952/53–1966/67
Harold Cameron, 1939/40
John Cameron, 1917/18
James Campbell, 1868/69
Keith Campbell, 1960/61–1978/79
Paul Campbell, 1989/90–1996/97
Archibald Cargill, 1876/77–1883/84
Tom Carlton, 1920/21–1921/22
William Carson, 1884/85–1887/88
Anthony Cartwright, 1961/62–1963/64
Leonard Casey, 1920/21–1922/23
Vic Cavanagh, 1927/28–1938/39
Charles Chadwick, 1911/12–1924/25
Leslie Chadwick, 1919/20
Robert Chadwick, 1904/05
Martin Chapman, 1864/65–1867/68
Reginald Cherry, 1919/20–1931/32
Tom Chettleburgh, 1932/33–1940/41
Max Chu, 2018/19–2022/23
Basil Church, 1871/72
Daniel Claffey, 1888/89–1889/90
Alan Clark, 1958/59–1959/60
Barney Clark, 1929/30
George Clark, 1872/73–1879/80
James Clark, 1933/34–1934/35
Alfred Clarke, 1893/94–1898/99
Frank Clayton, 1892/93–1896/97
Tommy Clout, 2018/19–2019/20
Edward Collinson, 1868/69–1885/86
James Condliffe, 1909/10–1913/14
Bevan Congdon, 1972/73–1973/74
Norris Conradi, 1917/18–1925/26
John Conway, 1879/80
Frank Cooke, 1879/80–1884/85
Richard Coulstock, 1863/64
Robert Couper, 1951/52
Robert Coupland, 1930/31–1932/33
Ben Cox, 2018/19
Keith Cox, 1933/34
Mark Craig, 2008/09–2018/19
Albert Cramond, 1904/05
Jack Crawford, 1914/15
William Crawshaw, 1877/78–1883/84
Michael Creagh, 1866/67
Gregor Croudis, 2016/17
William Croxford, 1890/91–1893/94
Martyn Croy, 1994/95–2001/02
Charles Crump, 1864/65–1867/68
Craig Cumming, 2000/01–2011/12
Jacob Cumming, 2021/22–2022/23
Edwin Cummings, 1909/10–1910/11
George Cummings, 1902/03–1904/05
Ernest Currie, 1893/94–1894/95
John Cushen, 1967/68–1986/87
Arthur Cutler, 1938/39–1946/47

D

John D'Arcy, 1960/61–1961/62
Robert Davenport, 1881/82–1883/84
Chris Davies, 1998/99
Alexander Dawes, 1884/85–1894/95
Garth Dawson, 1980/81–1984/85
Derek de Boorder, 2007/08–2017/18
Artie Dick, 1956/57–1960/61
Carlson Dickel, 1970/71–1982/83
Thomas Dickel, 1917/18
George Dickinson, 1921/22–1937/38
William Ditchfield, 1933/34
William Dixon, 1875/76–1885/86
Peter Dobbs, 1988/89–1994/95
William Douglas, 1878/79
William Mackie Douglas, 1922/23–1928/29
Alexander Downes, 1887/88–1913/14
William Downes, 1865/66–1875/76
Arthur Drabble, 1884/85–1891/92
Duncan Drew, 2000/01–2001/02
Jacob Duffy, 2011/12–2022/23
Ryan Duffy, 2013/14–2016/17
Hugh Duncan, 1921/22–1924/25
Stuart Duncan, 1925/26–1940/41
Steve Dunne, 1968/69
Desmond Dunnet, 1950/51
Jack Dunning, 1923/24–1937/38
Ernest Duret, 1889/90

E

Laurie Eastman, 1927/28–1928/29
Sean Eathorne, 2004/05–2016/17
Albertus Eckhoff, 1899/1900–1914/15
Lawrence Eckhoff, 1975/76
Alfred Eckhold, 1906/07–1921/22
Mervyn Edmunds, 1958/59–1959/60
Stewart Edward, 1966/67–1967/68
Allan Edwards, 1939/40–1940/41
Cedric Elmes, 1940/41
Olaf Everson, 1943/44

F

Paul Facoory, 1974/75–1984/85
Andrew Fairbairn, 1884/85
Fairfax Fenwick, 1875/76
Christopher Finch, 1993/94–1995/96
Steven Finn, 2011/12
Josh Finnie, 2014/15–2022/23
Arthur Fisher, 1890/91–1909/10
James Fitzgerald, 1883/84–1884/85
Shaun Fitzgibbon, 2014/15
John Flaherty, 1964/65–1968/69
Tom Flaws, 1952/53–1962/63
Simon Forde, 1998/99–2000/01
George Fox, 1888/89–1889/90
Dean Foxcroft, 2019/20–2022/23
William Frame, 1955/56–1957/58
Ian Fraser, 1918/19
Thomas Fraser, 1937/38–1952/53
Barry Freeman, 1969/70–1970/71
Thomas Freeman, 1943/44–1949/50
Tipene Friday, 2014/15
Charlie Frith, 1881/82–1889/90
William Frith, 1881/82
James Fuller, 2009/10–2012/13
Frederick Fulton, 1868/69–1878/79
James Fulton, 1863/64–1867/68
John Fulton, 1867/68–1874/75

G

Chris Gaffaney, 1995/96–2006/07
Aaron Gale, 1989/90–1999/2000
Alexander Gale, 1929/30
Arthur Galland, 1914/15–1930/31
Iain Gallaway, 1946/47–1947/48
Walter Garwood, 1873/74
Clive Geary, 1940/41
Albert Geddes, 1899/1900–1903/04
Lee Germon, 2000/01–2001/02
Jake Gibson, 2021/22–2022/23
Alex Gidman, 2007/08
Alan Gilbertson, 1951/52–1953/54
Leslie Giles, 1929/30
James Gill, 1953/54–1963/64
Andrew Given, 1914/15
James Glasgow, 1866/67–1868/69
Adam Glen, 1872/73–1886/87
Harry Godby, 1874/75–1875/76
Michael Godby, 1875/76
William Gollar, 1890/91
William Gough, 1953/54
Archibald Graham, 1944/45
Colin Graham, 1954/55–1955/56
Harry Graham, 1903/04–1906/07
Laurie Green, 1926/27
Andrew Grieve, 1884/85–1887/88
Leslie Groves, 1929/30–1949/50
Henry Gunthorp, 1902/03
John Guy, 1959/60

H

Walter Hadlee, 1945/46–1946/47
Frederick Haig, 1919/20
Shaun Haig, 2005/06–2010/11
William Haig, 1949/50–1957/58
Ronald Haley, 1970/71
Peter Hall, 1955/56
John Harkness, 1897/98–1900/01
Frederick Harper, 1886/87–1894/95
Anthony Harris, 2005/06
Ben Harris, 1989/90–1990/91
John Harris, 1865/66
Leonard Harris, 1881/82–1887/88
Benjamin Hart, 1997/98
Matt Harvie, 2003/04–2009/10
Robert Harwood, 1944/45–1945/46
Oscar Haskell, 1877/78–1889/90
Cam Hawkins, 2018/19–2020/21
William Hawksworth, 1929/30–1933/34
Arthur Hay, 1917/18
William Haydon, 1895/96–1897/98
Donald Heenan, 1928/29–1929/30
Ames Hellicar, 1872/73
Norman Henderson, 1935/36
William Hendley, 1864/65–1872/73
Russell Hendry, 1961/62–1973/74
Graham Henry, 1967/68
Paul Henry, 1996/97
Robert Hewat, 1889/90
Shawn Hicks, 2017/18–2018/19
Syd Hiddleston, 1909/10
William Higgins, 1910/11–1920/21
John Hill, 1961/62–1962/63
Robert Hill, 1976/77–1989/90
Peter Hills, 1978/79–1989/90
Simon Hinton, 1994/95
Kyle Hogg, 2006/07
William Holdaway, 1918/19
Allen Holden, 1937/38–1939/40
William Holden, 1917/18–1918/19
Jason Holder, 2013/14
Henry Holderness, 1918/19
Lewis Hollands, 1969/70–1971/72
Robert Holloway, 1961/62–1964/65
Allan Holmes, 1870/71–1873/74
John Hope, 1885/86–1899/1900
John Hope, 1863/64–1866/67
Cyril Hopkins, 1908/09–1912/13
Gareth Hopkins, 2003/04–2006/07
Andrew Hore, 1996/97–2004/05
Matt Horne, 1996/97–2000/01
Richard Hoskin, 1980/81–1992/93
Charles Howden, 1902/03–1908/09
Peter Howden, 1937/38
James Hume, 1880/81
Raymond Hunt, 1947/48–1953/54
David Hunter, 1989/90–1991/92
Jack Hunter, 2015/16–2018/19
John Huntley, 1912/13
James Hussey, 1902/03
Frank Hutchison, 1917/18–1919/20
Raymond Hutchison, 1965/66–1971/72

J

John Jacomb, 1863/64
Stanley James, 1953/54
Robin Jefferson, 1965/66
Louis Joel, 1899/1900
Llew Johnson, 2017/18–2022/23
Vaughn Johnson, 1984/85–1990/91
Robert Johnston, 1872/73–1873/74
William Johnston, 1889/90–1902/03
John Jolly, 1933/34
Glenn Jonas, 1998/99–1999/2000
Andrew Jones, 1983/84–1984/85
Raymond Jones, 1982/83
Stuart Jones, 1953/54

K

Albert Keast, 1917/18–1923/24
Nick Kelly, 2019/20–2021/22
Graham Kemp, 1987/88
Robert Kennedy, 1993/94–1997/98
John Kenny, 1911/12
Frank Kerr, 1934/35–1936/37
Charles Kettle, 1868/69–1871/72
Kassem Ibadulla, 1982/83–1990/91
Khalid Ibadulla, 1964/65–1966/67
William Kilgour, 1901/02–1907/08
Richard King, 1991/92–1995/96
Thomas Kingsland, 1886/87
Alfred Kinvig, 1893/94–1898/99
Christopher Kirk, 1977/78
Anaru Kitchen, 2015/16–2021/22
George Kitt, 1886/87
Alexander Knight, 1918/19–1943/44
Ernest Kruskopf, 1944/45

L

Sydney Lambert, 1873/74–1874/75
Michael Lamont, 1990/91–1998/99
William Lathbury, 1875/76
Alfred Lawson, 1944/45
Robbie Lawson, 1992/93–2003/04
Joseph Lawton, 1890/91–1893/94
VVS Laxman, 2008/09
John Leader, 1928/29–1940/41
Brett Lee, 2012/13
Warren Lees, 1971/72–1987/88
John Leith, 1880/81
Thomas Lemin, 1929/30–1939/40
Frederick Liggins, 1896/97–1900/01
John Lindsay, 1980/81–1991/92
Thomas Livingston, 1917/18
Dion Lobb, 2006/07
Ben Lockrose, 2017/18–2022/23
Arthur Lomas, 1919/20
Robert Long, 1953/54–1963/64
G Lynch, 1873/74

M

Lynn McAlevey, 1975/76
Vernon McArley, 1947/48–1957/58
Charlie Macartney, 1909/10
Dan McBeath, 1917/18–1922/23
Vincent McCarten, 1944/45
Mitchell McClenaghan, 2020/21
Arthur MacCormick, 1888/89
Brendon McCullum, 1999/2000–2014/15
Nathan McCullum, 1999/2000–2015/16
Stuart McCullum, 1976/77–1990/91
Colin McDonald, 1968/69
F MacDonald, 1863/64
Randell McDonnell, 1867/68–1875/76
Bill McDougall, 1944/45–1946/47
Christopher Mace, 1863/64
John Mace, 1863/64
Murray McEwan, 1957/58
James MacFarlane, 1886/87–1889/90
Thomas MacFarlane, 1870/71–1873/74
Thomas Albert McFarlane, 1909/10–1919/20
Peter McGlashan, 2002/03
Gordon McGregor, 1935/36–1939/40
J McGregor, 1884/85
Noel McGregor, 1947/48–1968/69
James McHaffie, 1931/32
David McHardy, 1991/92–1992/93
Jarrod McKay, 2020/21–2022/23
Brian McKechnie, 1971/72–1985/86
Don McKechnie, 1975/76–1980/81
Angus McKenzie, 2019/20–2021/22
John McKenzie, 1893/94–1894/95
Michael MacKenzie, 1992/93
Marcel McKenzie, 2002/03–2007/08
Norman McKenzie, 1972/73
William Mackersy, 1906/07–1907/08
Kenneth McKnight, 1987/88–1991/92
Stewart McKnight, 1958/59–1966/67
Duncan McLachlan, 1912/13
William McLennan, 1879/80
James McMillan, 2000/01–2014/15
John McMullan, 1917/18–1929/30
Hugh MacNeil, 1877/78–1893/94
Warren McSkimming, 1999/2000–2011/12
Henry Maddock, 1863/64–1869/70
Walter Malcolm, 1914/15
John Mallard, 1882/83–1884/85
Neil Mallender, 1983/84–1992/93
Evan Marshall, 1991/92–2001/02
Peter Marshall, 1991/92
George Martin, 1908/09
Wayne Martin, 1976/77–1978/79
Dimitri Mascarenhas, 2008/09–2011/12
Ata Matatumua, 1966/67–1967/68
Stephen Mather, 1998/99–1999/2000
Russell Mawhinney, 1990/91–1991/92
Robert Maxwell, 1970/71
Matthew Maynard, 1996/97–1997/98
William Meares, 1873/74–1876/77
Barry Milburn, 1963/64–1982/83
Adam Miles, 2015/16
Gordon Millington, 1876/77–1880/81
Arthur Mills, 1947/48
George Mills, 1900/01–1902/03
George Henry Mills, 1935/36–1957/58
Leslie Milnes, 1944/45–1948/49
D Mitchell, 1881/82–1882/83
John Mitchell, 1968/69
Mohammad Wasim, 2002/03–2004/05
Alex Moir, 1949/50–1961/62
Denis Moloney, 1929/30–1939/40
Leonard Monk, 1901/02
Philip Monk, 1928/29–1929/30
Alastair Monteath, 1939/40
James Moore, 1905/06
Leighton Morgan, 2007/08–2009/10
Nathan Morland, 1996/97–2003/04
Alexander Morris, 1884/85
Charles Morris, 1863/64
Philip Morris, 1975/76–1976/77
Henry Morrison, 1880/81
William Morrison, 1876/77–1880/81
Frederick Muir, 1872/73
Murray Muir, 1949/50
Edward Mulcock, 1943/44
Travis Muller, 2019/20–2022/23
Donald Murdoch, 1943/44–1944/45
Geoffrey Murdoch, 1974/75
Ronald Murdoch, 1964/65
William Murison, 1864/65–1866/67
John Murtagh, 1988/89

N

Dirk Nannes, 2014/15
Chris Nash, 2010/11
Dion Nash, 1992/93–1993/94
James Neesham, 2011/12–2017/18
James Nelson, 1914/15
Peter Neutze, 1984/85
Joseph Nicholls, 1876/77
Colin Nicholson, 1963/64
Kenneth Nicholson, 1971/72–1972/73
Victor Nicholson, 1914/15
Rob Nicol, 2017/18
John Nimmo, 1933/34–1936/37
Robert Niven, 1877/78–1888/89
Kieran Noema-Barnett, 2006/07

O
Kevin O'Connor, 1969/70–1970/71
Shayne O'Connor, 1994/95–2002/03
Karl O'Dowda, 1991/92–2000/01
Geoffrey Osborne, 1977/78–1981/82
John O'Sullivan, 1946/47–1947/48
Guy Overton, 1945/46–1955/56

P

George Paramor, 1873/74–1880/81
Mark Parker, 1996/97
Murray Parker, 1967/68–1969/70
Thomas Parker, 1864/65–1866/67
William Parker, 1880/81–1896/97
Thorn Parkes, 2021/22–2022/23
Gordon Patrick, 1918/19
Bill Patrick, 1917/18
Justin Paul, 1992/93–1994/95
Ian Payne, 1947/48–1951/52
Walter Pearless, 1904/05
Lance Pearson, 1961/62–1970/71
Peter Petherick, 1975/76–1977/78
Dale Phillips, 2019/20–2022/23
Rhys Phillips, 2014/15–2016/17
Graeme Powell, 1969/70–1977/78
Michael Powell, 2005/06
William Priest, 1931/32–1932/33
Raymond Procter, 1960/61
Robert Prouting, 1969/70
Craig Pryor, 2000/01–2001/02
John Purdue, 1938/39

R

Michael Rae, 2014/15–2022/23
Ben Raine, 2018/19
Albert Rains, 1894/95–1896/97
John Ramsden, 1909/10–1914/15
Charles Rattray, 1883/84–1896/97
George Rayner, 1887/88
Lawrence Reade, 1870/71–1876/77
George Reardon, 1903/04
Daryll Reddington, 2002/03
James Redfearn, 1863/64
Aaron Redmond, 2004/05–2014/15
Darron Reekers, 1997/98
Mitch Renwick, 2018/19–2021/22
John Reid, 1956/57–1957/58
David Rhodes, 1874/75
Hiram Rhodes, 1872/73–1876/77
Simon Richards, 1983/84–1984/85
H Richardson, 1865/66
Mark Richardson, 1992/93–2000/01
Michael Rippon, 2016/17–2022/23
Albert Roberts, 1944/45–1950/51
Gordon Robertson, 1937/38–1940/41
Iain Robertson, 2010/11–2014/15
William Robertson, 1960/61
Ray Robinson, 1946/47–1948/49
Shane Robinson, 1984/85–1996/97
Bradley Rodden, 2013/14–2014/15
Henry Rose, 1876/77–1883/84
Robert Roy, 1970/71–1971/72
Neil Rushton, 1999/2000–2003/04
Hamish Rutherford, 2008/09–2022/23
Ian Rutherford, 1974/75–1983/84
Ken Rutherford, 1982/83–1994/95
Robert Rutherford, 1908/09–1913/14
Jesse Ryder, 2013/14–2014/15

S

Douglas St. John, 1946/47–1950/51
Matthew Sale, 1997/98
George Sampson, 1874/75
Henry Sampson, 1973/74–1975/76
Mervyn Sandri, 1956/57
Charles Saxton, 1934/35–1938/39
John Scandrett, 1935/36–1943/44
Bradley Scott, 2000/01–2016/17
Peter Semple, 1961/62–1971/72
David Sewell, 1995/96–2005/06
Dayle Shackel, 1993/94
Frank Shacklock, 1903/04–1904/05
Gareth Shaw, 2005/06
Jordan Sheed, 2001/02–2008/09
James Shepherd, 1912/13–1930/31
Cliff Shirley, 1945/46
Harry Siedeberg, 1898/99–1921/22
Ron Silver, 1935/36–1945/46
Peter Skelton, 1953/54
William Skitch, 1883/84
Craig Smith, 2004/05–2015/16
Dennis Smith, 1931/32–1932/33
James Smith, 1914/15–1921/22
Lankford Smith, 1934/35–1956/57
Nathan Smith, 2015/16–2020/21
Nicholas Smith, 1969/70
Rhiane Smith, 1992/93–1995/96
Robert Smith, 2001/02
William Somerville, 2004/05–2007/08
Thomas Sonntag, 1883/84
Blair Soper, 2012/13–2019/20
Ralph Spraggon, 1894/95–1896/97
John Spring, 1877/78–1884/85
Frederick Stanley, 1950/51–1953/54
Frederick Stephenson, 1890/91
Darren Stevens, 2010/11
Raymond Stewart, 1963/64–1968/69
Russell Stewart, 1973/74–1977/78
Walter Strang, 1929/30
Henry Stronach, 1892/93–1894/95
Bert Sutcliffe, 1946/47–1961/62
H Sutcliffe, 1875/76
Trevor Sutherland, 1979/80
Arthur Symonds, 1926/27

T

William Tait, 1872/73–1874/75
Ron Talbot, 1933/34–1935/36
Josh Tasman-Jones, 2016/17–2021/22
Ryan ten Doeschate, 2012/13–2014/15
Neale Thompson, 1956/57–1962/63
Graeme Thomson, 1973/74–1980/81
James Thomson, 1873/74
Greg Todd, 2004/05–2009/10
Cecil Toomey, 1939/40–1945/46
Francis Toomey, 1934/35–1935/36
Richard Torrance, 1905/06–1927/28
Sean Tracy, 1990/91
Jonathan Trott, 2005/06
Bertie Tuckwell, 1912/13–1914/15
Albert Turnbull, 1896/97
Percival Turnbull, 1884/85
Glenn Turner, 1964/65–1982/83
Nicholas Turner, 2006/07–2007/08
Gibson Turton, 1863/64–1871/72

U
Kenneth Uttley, 1933/34–1938/39

V
Henry Vallange, 1886/87
John Vear, 1959/60–1960/61
John Veitch, 1957/58–1963/64
Edward Vernon, 1878/79–1879/80
Christi Viljoen, 2015/16–2018/19
William Vorrath, 1927/28–1929/30

W

Neil Wagner, 2008/09–2017/18
Scott Waide, 2001/02
Derek Walker, 1980/81–1988/89
John Walls, 1886/87
Kerry Walmsley, 2000/01–2002/03
Ivan Walsh, 1948/49–1949/50
Eric Watson, 1947/48–1959/60
Harold Watson, 1907/08–1914/15
Leo Watson, 1911/12
Leonard Watson, 1953/54
David Watt, 1943/44
Les Watt, 1943/44–1962/63
Murray Webb, 1969/70–1973/74
Richard Webb, 1974/75–1983/84
William Webb, 1897/98–1900/01
Rudi Webster, 1966/67–1967/68
Frank Wells, 1895/96–1896/97
Sam Wells, 2007/08–2016/17
Roy Westbrook, 1914/15–1921/22
Beckham Wheeler-Greenall, 2021/22
John Wilkie, 1901/02
Robert Wilkie, 1899/1900
Anthony Wilkinson, 2001/02–2002/03
Arnold Williams, 1886/87–1894/95
Frank Williams, 1898/99–1908/09
Garry Williams, 1975/76–1977/78
JW Wills, 1869/70
Brad Wilson, 2015/16–2018/19
Charles Wilson, 1905/06–1911/12
Ernest Wilson, 1927/28
Jeff Wilson, 1991/92–2005/06
Robert Wilson, 1971/72–1978/79
John Wilson, 1982/83–1988/89
Paul Wiseman, 1994/95–2000/01
Richard Wixon, 1993/94–1994/95
Norman Woods, 1958/59–1965/66
Charles Wordsworth, 1908/09–1909/10
Rupert Worker, 1923/24–1925/26
Calvert Worthington, 1864/65–1865/66
William Wyinks, 1882/83–1885/86

Y
Yasir Arafat, 2009/10

Z
Carl Zimmerman, 1925/26–1929/30

Notes

References

Bibliography
McCarron A (2010) New Zealand Cricketers 1863/64–2010. Cardiff: The Association of Cricket Statisticians and Historians.

External links
Otago Cricket Association website

Otago cricketers